The Citadel Bulldogs basketball teams represented The Citadel, The Military College of South Carolina in Charleston, South Carolina, United States.  The program was established in 1900–01, and has continuously fielded a team since 1912–13.  Their primary rivals are College of Charleston, Furman and VMI.

1984–85

|-
|colspan=7 align=center|1985 Southern Conference men's basketball tournament

1985–86

|-
| colspan=7 align=center|1986 Southern Conference men's basketball tournament

1986–87

|-
| colspan=7 align=center|1987 Southern Conference men's basketball tournament

1987–88

With McAlister Field House undergoing renovation, the Bulldogs played home games at College of Charleston's home arena, John Kresse Arena and North Charleston High School.

|-
| colspan=7 align=center|1988 Southern Conference men's basketball tournament

1988–89

Due to the continuing renovations of McAlister Field House, the Bulldogs played home games at the on-campus Deas Hall.  This facility is traditionally used for cadet recreation and fitness.

|-
| colspan=7 align=center|1989 Southern Conference men's basketball tournament

References
 

The Citadel Bulldogs basketball seasons